Ken Yeang (6 October 1948) is an architect, ecologist, planner and author from Malaysia, best known for his ecological architecture and ecomasterplans that have a distinctive green aesthetic. He pioneered an ecology-based architecture (since 1971), working on the theory and practice of sustainable design. The Guardian newspaper (2008) named him "one of the 50 people who could save the planet".[ 1] Yeang's headquarters is in Kuala Lumpur (Malaysia) as Hamzah & Yeang, with offices in London (UK) as Llewelyn Davies Ken Yeang Ltd. and Beijing (China) as North Hamzah Yeang Architectural and Engineering Company.

Biography

Formative Years

Born in Penang, Malaysia, he attended Penang Free School (1961-1962) and entered Cheltenham College (Gloucestershire,1962-1967).[2]

He qualified in architecture from the AA (Architectural Association) School of Architecture (London) where he did freelance illustrations and graphic work for the AD, AAQ magazines and for the AA. His dissertation at Cambridge University, "A Theoretical Framework for Incorporating Ecological Considerations in the Design and Planning of the Built Environment" earned him a PhD, published as ‘Designing With Nature’ (McGraw-Hill, 1995)[2] and as 'Proyectar Con La Naturaleza’ (Gustavo Gili, SA, 1999). Academically, he holds the Distinguished Plym Professor chair (University of Illinois, USA, 2005). His honorary degrees include D.Litt.(Hon.) (Sheffield University, UK 2004), PhD (Hon.) (University of Malaya, 2013), D. Arch (Hon.) (Universidad Ricardo Palma, Peru 2016), D.Sc (Hon..) (Taylors University, Malaysia 2017).

Yeang attended courses on ecology (Department of Environmental Biology at Cambridge University), partial attendance in ecological landuse planning (Department of Landscape Architecture, University Pennsylvania, under Ian McHarg). These provided the ecological basis for Yeang’s work and work on his biodiversity and ecomimicry approach to ecological architecture and masterplanning, joining the British Ecological Society in 1975. Other courses attended includes business management at the Malaysian Institute of Management, the Singapore Institute of Management and a short course at Harvard Business School.

Professional career

He is registered as an architect with ARB (Architects Registration Board) (UK, 1972), RIBA (Royal Institute of Architects) (UK), PAM (Pertubuhan Arkitek Malaysia), and Singapore Institute of Architects (SIA). He is a Fellow of the SIA, Fellow (Hon.) of the AIA (American institute of Architects), Fellow (Hon.) of the Royal Incorporation of Architects in Scotland, and Fellow (Hon.) Wolfson College, Cambridge University.

Yeang interned at S.T.S. Leong (Singapore, 1969–70), worked at Louis de Soisson Partnership (1969), Akitek Bersekutu (Kuala Lumpur,1974) and joined fellow AA alumni, Tengku Datuk Robert Hamzah as T. R. Hamzah & Rakan-Rakan)[3] (1975) which became T. R . Hamzah & Yeang Sdn. Bhd. (1976). Yeang also served as Design Director and Chairman for Llewelyn Davies Ken Yeang (UK, 2005) until it was dissolved in 2012 .

Yeang has completed over 12 bioclimatic eco high-rise buildings, several thousand dwellings (terraced houses), over two million sq. ft. interior design space, numerous eco-master plans and eco-city designs.

Yeang lectures extensively at conferences and schools of architecture (over 30 countries worldwide). He currently holds the Distinguished Plym Professorship chair (University of Illinois). He has been Professor of Practice (Texas A & M University0, Graham Willis Professor (University of Sheffield), Provost’s Distinguished Visiting Scholar (University of Southern California), Visiting Eminent Scholar (Florida Atlantic University), Advisory Professor (Tongji University, Shanghai), Honorary Professor (University of Hong Kong), misc. Adjunct Professorships (Royal Melbourne Institute of Technology, University of Hawaii, University of New South Wales, Curtin University, University of Malaya, Deakin University),

Yeang served as board member of public listed MBf Property Unit Trust, the Malaysian Institute of Architects Education Fund, Advisory Board of the Government of Malaysia’s Genovasi (2013), President of the Malaysian Institute of Architects, Chairman ARCASIA (Asian Council of Architects), Vice-President Commonwealth Association of Architects and Council Member RIBA (Royal Institute of British Architects).

His key built work include the Roof-Roof House (Malaysia), Menara Mesiniaga (IBM franchise) (Malaysia), National Library Singapore (Singapore), Solaris (with CPG Consult, Singapore), Spire Edge Tower (with Abraxas Architects, India), DiGi Data Centre (Malaysia), Great Ormond Street Children's Hospital Extension (under Llewelyn Davies Yeang, UK), the Genome Research Building (Hong Kong with ALKF & Associates), Suasana Putrajaya (Putrajaya, 2017).

Work on Ecological Design

Yeang's research and technical work is in ecological architecture and masterplanning, establishing the formal basis for design, focussing on the biointegration of the human-made with nature, creating hybrid systems as ‘constructed ecosystems’. His work adopts bioclimatic design (climate-responsive passive low-energy) as a subset to ecological design, providing for him an underlying armature for ecological design. The approach also engenders critical regionalist features where climatic responses provide the links to its locality.

A key project is Yeang’s own house, the 'Roof-Roof' House (1985) which is his early experimental bioclimatic built work. The dwelling has an identifiable curved louvred umbrella-like upper roof-structure that functions as a solar-filtering device and device that shades the building's lower roof terrace. Its side 'wind wing-walls' directs wind into the dining area. The swimming pool on the east functions as an evaporative-cooling device bring in the predominantly easterly breeze into the adjoining internal living spaces. The many features make the building an instructive reference prototype for his subsequent work on climate-responsive and ecological architecture. Influences can be further found in Yeang's later building and planning work. Yeang applied the bioclimatic passive-mode principles to the high-rise tower typology. Contending that the high-rise tower as an intensive built form will not go away overnight because of its existent economic basis arising from high urban land values and ability to accommodate rapid urban growth. He sought ecologically benign ways to make this built form green and humane to inhabit. Professor Udo Kultermann (Washington University) credits him as the inventor of the 'bioclimatic skyscraper',

The Mesiniaga Tower (an IBM Franchise, 1992) brought together earlier experimental bioclimatic ideas in a single built form, such as the placement of the elevator core as a solar buffers to the tower's hot sides, placement of toilets and stairwells with natural ventilation opportunities, adopting various solar-path shaped sun-shades, use of an evaporative-cooling pool at the uppermost level, the overhead louvred canopy as a framework for future PV cells, and the vegetated and stepped façade and recessed sky-terraces as interstitial semi-enclosed spaces for building's users. This building as a prototype received several awards including the Aga Khan Award for Architecture (1993), The Malaysian Institute of Architects Award, the Singapore Institute of Architects Award, The Royal Australian Institute of Architects Award and a citation from the American Institute of Architects (AIA).

The Solaris building (Singapore, 2008) brought together his ideas on ecological architecture with a continuous landscaped ramp and other experimental devices. His ideas for an urban park-in-the-sky in the high-rise building type is manifested as a 'vertical linear park' in his Solaris Building (2011) at 1-North Singapore that is a benchmark building in his green agenda for designing buildings as bioint gratin with nature. The building has an ecologically-linked vegetated pedestrian walkway ramp that is 1.3 km in length as a 'vertical linear park', punctuated by sky garden terraces located at each of the building's corners, further linked to a mid-level and to the uppermost-level roof gardens.

His work on biodiversity and systemic biointegration were implemented in the Suasana Putrajaya (Putrajaya, 2017) based on a 'biodiversity targets matrix' originally proposed for the GyeonGgi Master Plan (Seoul, Korea).

The Solaris' vertical linear park device led to his concept of the continuous 'green eco-infrastructure', a device that enables a vital ecological nexus between the built form and its surrounding landscape, bioregion and its hinterland, that became habitats and a crucial biodiversity and wildlife corridor in all his subsequent masterplanning and eco-city design work (e.g. the SOMA Masterplan in Bangalore, India) and in his architecture (e.g. the Spire Edge Tower, in Gurgaon, India, completion c. 2015). This green eco-infrastructure concept led to his developing a unifying platform for eco-master planning as the weaving together of 'four sets of eco-infrastructures' into a unified system.

Yeang work on the high-rise typology as 'vertical green urbanism' (c.1990’s) sought to reinvent the skyscraper as 'vertical urban design'.[4] His ideas invert the high-rise typology as a 'city-in-the-sky', first exemplified in the National Library Singapore (2005). The building features large 40m high 'public realms-in-the sky' as verdantly landscaped 'skycourt gardens', a ground plane as an 'open-to-the-sky' plaza for public festivals and culture-related activities. The thickened first floor slab over the plaza functions biol climatically as an evaporative-cooling mass to the public realm below. Multiple upper-level sky-bridges link the building's two blocks (one containing the book collections and the other shaped block for programming activities. The naturally-ventilated atrium between the blocks has a ventilating louvred canopy that serves as its 'fifth facade'. There are two multi-volume reading rooms are located at either sides. At the uppermost roof is a promontory viewing pod. The building's built form has an organic geometry in his ongoing explorations to derive an ecological aesthetic (see below). The building received Singapore’s BCA Green Mark Platinum rating.

Yeang worked on the Great Ormond Street Children's Hospital Extension (London, UK) (completed 2011) as a green healthcare facility in a temperate climate. The building has a mixed-mode flue-wall providing natural ventilation during the mid-seasons to the Walt Disney operated ground floor Café, a sedum-planted roof, with various low energy building systems (CHP, etc.), use of green materials, etc. The building is BREEAM rated 'excellent'.

His work on the development of a 'platform' for eco-master planning and designing eco-cities regards designing the built environment as 'a living system' that is both interactive and functional through the bio-integration of the 'four eco-infrastructural armatures' into an overall coherent system The approach provides an indeterminate framework enabling inclusivity of changing complex factors and technologies in a flexibility that allows for technological obsolescence while encouraging innovation.[5]

A theoretical rigorousness underpins his work. His earlier Cambridge doctoral dissertation (1975) presents a unifying comprehensive theoretical model for eco-design defining the prime factors in eco-design in four sets of interdependent 'environmental interactions', assembled in a mathematical 'partitioned-matrix'. This theoretical model continues to serve as the underlying guiding framework for his present eco-architecture and eco-master planning work.

The impact of Yeang's work on architecture is based on his patterns of biointegration of biotic constituents with the inorganic structure of the built environment. The approach involves creating viable habitats within the development and then matching these with selected native fauna species whether for feeding, breeding or refuge to enhance local biodiversity. These are matched with selected flora species in a composite 'biodiversity matrix '. This endeavour takes eco-design beyond accreditation systems, likely as the next stage in green design, redefining the relationship of the built systems with the ecology of the landscape, enabling a higher level of bio-integration.

In Yeang's oeuvre of design, built and theoretical work, his most important and instructive contribution is his advancing the macro ecology-based land use planning approach of the landscape architect Ian McHarg and in extending and articulating this from its macro urban regional scale to the micro level of architectural design at the scale of the built form using his biointegation patterns. This was an endeavour that McHarg had sought to do but unable likely limited by being a landscape architect.

His recent work explores the concept of 'eco-mimicry' as designing the built environment as constructed ecosystems that emulates the processes, structure and attributes of ecosystems. ‘Eco-mimicry’ is a concept he first used in his papers on the use of biological analogies in design in Yeang, K.(1972), Bases for Ecosystem Design, in Architectural Design, Architectural Press, London (1973)), and in Yeang, K. (1974), Bionics: The Use of Biological Analogies in Design, in AAQ No.4 (Architectural Association Quarterly), London, UK, The ideas can also be found in, Learning From Nature: The Ecomimicry Project (Marshall, Alex, poster paper, Environmental Education conference, Western Australia (2006). The term 'eco-mimicry' is regarded by Yeang as an outgrowth from the ‘bio-mimicry’ and 'eco-mimetics'. Yeang's eco-mimicry refers to physical, structural and systemic mimicry of ecosystems, and not to be mistaken with a simplistic 'visual' mimicry which he regards as superficial.

Many regard Yeang’s work as simply placing vegetation in his builtforms or as just creating an ecological nexus (continuous link) within his builtforms to enhance local biodiversity. Yeang’s work does much more than the addition of greenery and landscaping in his builtforms. The unique factor is involves the creation of new habitats within and around the development, matching of selected native species with these constructed habitats, setting their ‘biodiversity targets’ to achieve the expected level of biodiversity and providing physical conditions within these habitats to enable the selected species to survive over the seasons of the year. His built work become more than just ‘vertically-landscaped architecture’ but are in effect constructed ‘living systems’.[6] This differentiates his work from others who imitate his work by just placement of planting within their built forms.

Recognition and awards
Hamzah & Yeang's design and built work have been recognised by the over 70 awards received since 1989 that include the:
 Aga Khan Award for Architecture (for the Menara Mesiniaga, an IBM franchise) 
 Prince Claus Award (Netherlands, 1999) 
 The UIA (International Union of Architects) Auguste Perret Award
 Several Malaysian Institute of Architects (PAM) annual design awards
 The WACA (World Association of Chinese Architects) Gold Medals (for the Solaris Building, 2011 and for the National Library Singapore)
 The Holcim Regional Award for Sustainability (Switzerland) (for the Putrajaya Phase 2C5 building, Malaysia, 2011), 
His personal awards include:

• Liangsicheng Prize (2017), Architectural Society China

• Greenseal Award (BCA, Singapore, 2016)
 PAM (Malaysia Institute of Architects) Gold Medal
• UIA Auguste Perret Award
 Government of Malaysia’s ‘Darjah Mulia Pangkuan Negeri (DMPN) Award (that carries the official title of ‘Dato’ (2003) generally regarded as the Malaysian equivalent of the UK’s OBE)
 Lynn S. Beedle Lifetime Achievement Award from the Council on Tall Buildings and Urban Habitat (USA)
 Merdeka Award (for the 'environment' category, 2011) from the Government of Malaysia, regarded as its national equivalent of the Nobel prize.
5. Ecological Aesthetic.

Yeang pursuit of eco-architecture and eco-masterplanning theories, concepts and ideas have been carried out in parallel with an exploration for an 'ecological aesthetic', in questioning "...What a green building and masterplan should look like?"

Yeang contends that an ecological architectural aesthetic should resemble a living system, looking natural, verdant and hirsute with nature and its processes visible in the bio-integration of the synthetic builtform's physical constituents (abiotic) with the native fauna, flora (the biotic constituents) and the environmental biological processes of the land. He contends that much of existent architecture and masterplans that lay claim by other elsewhere to be sustainable are simply commonly-styled or iconically-styled builtforms stuffed internally with eco-engineering gadgetry and with occasional vegetation in its upper open courts. Yeang contends that an eco-architecture and an eco-city should be 'alive' as a living system, analogous to a constructed ecosystem and not 'de-natured' nor look predominantly inorganic, artificial and synthetic. He adopts these assertions as the basis for his eco-architecture.

Yeang contends that eco-architecture and eco-masterplans demand their own identifiable 'style'. It is this distinctive green vegetated eco-aesthetic in Yeang's architecture and masterplans that brought international attention to his work. His eco-aesthetic does not have the shape or form that in any way resemble existent architectural styles. This aesthetic is an independent aesthetic that encompasses eco-design holistically and which comes from an interpretation, an understanding and the inclusion of ecological constituents and processes of its locality in its built form. This can be regarded as an emergent ecological aesthetic, where its shapes and forms have a nexus with adjoining ecosystems, which harmonise with the site's ecology, enhance local biodiversity, besides having other eco performance features such denying negative consequences, avert polluting emissions, be more energy and water efficient and carbon neutral than conventional buildings, and other eco-design attributes. He sees the eco-architecture as designed like a 'constructed living system'. Lord Norman Foster of Thames Bank refers to Yeang's eco-aesthetics, "Ken Yeang has developed a distinctive architectural vocabulary that extends beyond questions of style to confront issues of sustainability and how we can build in harmony of the natural world." (2011).
Yeang's work in his relentless pursuit of an original bio-integrated 'ecological aesthetic' can be regarded as Yeang's other contribution to this field.

Key Projects 

Yeang has completed over 200 built projects since 1975. His benchmark buildings, projects and their innovations include:

The EDITT Tower (unbuilt) – Waterloo Road, Singapore – a 2ndn prize winner, EDITT competition. 
The project has been published in over 30 international publications for its hirsute extensively-vegetated ramp façade and aesthetic.
The Roof Roof House – Selangor, Malaysia (1985) – an experimental climate-responsive house that rethought bioclimatic passive-mode low-energy building design.
Menara Mesiniaga Tower – Selangor, Malaysia (1992) – a climate-responsive tower that exemplifies Yeang’s key principles for 'bioclimatic skyscraper' design, and received the Aga Khan Award for Architecture, the RAIA (Royal Australian Institute of Architects) International Award, the Malaysian institute of Architects Design Award.
Kowloon Waterfront Masterplan – Hong Kong (c. 1998) – a green masterplan where Yeang developed the green eco infrastructure concept and the novel use of 'eco cells'.
National Library – Singapore (2005) – a green library tower (120m) with large landscaped sky courts (40m high) that received the BCA Green Mark Platinum Award 2005, and the Singapore Institute of Architects Award.
SOMA Masterplan – Bangalore, India (2006) – a signature eco masterplan that espouses his innovative idea for eco city masterplanning as the integration of four eco infrastructures, with the use of eco bridges and eco undercrofts to enable an ecological nexus across the terrain.
DiGi Technical Office – Shah Alam, Malaysia (2010) – advances the idea of a 'living' eco wall as a nexus of greenery linking all the facades. It received the Malaysian Institute of Architects Design Award (Commendation, 2010) and Green Building Index Gold rating.
Solaris Tower – 1-north, Singapore (2010) [with CPG Consult]- with a 1.5 km long 'Vertical Linear Park'  vegetated ramp that wraps itself around the tower's façade, a diagonal light-shaft, automated glass-louvers roof over the atrium, rain-check walls at the ground floor, which received the Singapore Institute of Architects Award (2011), the Malaysian institute of Architects Gold Award 2011, the WACA (World Association of Chinese Architects) Gold Medal 2011 and BCA Green Mark Platinum rating.
Spire Edge Tower – (Gurgaon, Haryana, India), under construction with anticipated completion 2013, a signature tower that espouses the idea of a vertical green eco infrastructure, LEED Platinum rating.
Ganendra Art House – Petaling Jaya, Malaysia (2011) – Art Gallery with accommodation for live-in artist has an experimental 'down-draft' ventilating flue for enhancing comfort cooling, received the Malaysian Institute of Architects Design Award (Commendation) 2010, Green Building Index certification rating.
The Great Ormond Street Children's Hospital Extension Phase 1 (2011) [with Llewelyn Davies Yeang] – London, UK, BREEAM 'excellent rating'
GyeongGi Development, Seoul, Korea (unbuilt) – habitat creation that exemplifies the use of a Biodiversity Matrix that makes the development into a total 'living system'..

Projects (construction completion year)
 Plaza Atrium, Kuala Lumpur, 1981
 Roof-Roof house, Kuala Lumpur 1985
 Menara Boustead, Kuala Lumpur, 1986
 Menara Mesiniaga, Subang Jaya, Malaysia, 1992
 MBF Tower, Penang, Malaysia,1993
 TA1 Tower, Kuala Lumpur, Malaysia.
 TTDI The Plaza and Residence Towers and retail, Kuala Lumpur, Malaysia1996
 UMNO Tower, Penang, 1998
 Mutiara Mesiniaga Penang, Penang, 2003
 Mewah Oils Headquarters, Malaysia 2005
 National Library of Singapore, Singapore, 2005
 Limkokwing University of Creative Technology (Main campus, Cyberjaya), Malaysia, 2006
 TA2 Tower, Kuala Lumpur, Malaysia, 2005
 Ganendra Art House, Malaysia, 2010
 Calvary Convention Centre, Kuala Lumpur, Malaysia 2012
 Great Ormond Street Children's Hospital Extension Phase 1, London (UK) 2011)
 LGT Hijauan Towers, Kuala Lumpur, Malaysia (Completion 2018)
 Fu Gong Shan, Johore, Malaysia (2016)

Other projects

 Tokyo-Nara Tower, Tokyo, Japan, 1994
 Elephant and Castle EcoTower, London
 Al-Asima, Kuwait
 CAAG Tower, London
 Enterprise Building 4, Cyberjaya, Malaysia
 Jabal Omar Towers, Mecca, Saudi Arabia
 Dubai Towers, UAE
 Beijing Mega Hall North
 Taipei Capital Plaza
 Chongging Tower, China
 Vancouver Waterfront, Canada
 Premier City, Almaty, Kazakhstan

Current projects under construction
 Putrajaya Phase 2C5 Towers (offices and retail) (Completion 2016)
 Y Cantonments, Penang, Malaysia (2015)

Publications
 1995 Designing With Nature: The Ecological Basis for Architectural Design, Mcgraw-Hill Designing with Nature
 1997 Skyscraper, Bioclimatically Considered: A Design Primer, Wiley-Academy Skyscraper-Bioclimatically-Considered
 2000 The Green Skyscraper: The Basis for Designing Sustainable Intensive Buildings, Prestel
 2002 Reinventing the Skyscraper: A Vertical Theory of Urban Design, Academy Press
 2007 Eco Skyscrapers, Images Publishing
 2008 Ecodesign: A Manual for Ecological Design, Wiley
 2009 EcoMasterplanning, Wiley 
 2011 Ecoarchitecture: The Work of Ken Yeang, Ecoarchitecture

Sources
 Hart, Sara, Ecoarchitecture – The Work of Ken Yeang, John Wiley & Sons (2011), UK
 Powell, Robert Rethinking the Skyscraper: the complete architecture of Ken Yeang, Thames & Hudson (1999),

Footnotes

External links
 Website of T. R. Hamzah & Yeang Sdn. Bhd.
 Biography and interview with Ken Yeang, and an image gallery of his work. CNN, July 2007
 Interview with Ken Yeang 2009(Video)
 2009 Green Source Magazine Article on Solaris, Singapore

Malaysian architects
Alumni of Wolfson College, Cambridge
Malaysian people of Chinese descent
Architects of Chinese descent
1948 births
Living people
Skyscraper architects
People educated at Cheltenham College